Stygobromus clantoni, commonly called Clanton's cave amphipod, is a troglomorphic species of amphipod in family Crangonyctidae. It is native to Kansas and Missouri in the United States.

References

Freshwater crustaceans of North America
Crustaceans described in 1934
Cave crustaceans
clantoni